Malice in Wonderland is a Norwegian rock band.

Biography
Malice in Wonderland was founded in the late 1990s.

Their self-titled debut album was released in Norway on Karisma Records/Dark Essence Records in 2005 and abroad the following year. The lead single "Lucifer's Town" became an internet hit and had more than 1 million plays on Myspace. Malice In Wonderland released several singles, amongst them City Angel, mixed by Tim Palmer (U2, Ozzy Osbourne) which was listed on Finnish radio.

They have toured in Europe and Asia, played with renowned artists like Def Leppard and appeared on several TV-shows and productions.

December 20, 2013 Malice In Wonderland released their last album "The Royal Brigade". The album is mixed by John Fryer (Depeche Mode, Nine Inch Nails).

August 15 2015 the band announced that they are breaking up and in the following months they did several farewell shows in Norway and abroad.

Chris Wicked later announced that he will work under his own name, singing in Norwegian. March 2018 he released a single called "Bare Deg og Meg og Natten".

Discography

Albums

Singles

Unofficial works

Live covers
 The Rolling Stones – Gimme Shelter
 Midnight Oil – Beds Are Burning
 Guns N' Roses – My Michelle
 Lenny Kravitz – Are You Gonna Go My Way
 Jace Everett – Bad things
 VNV Nation – Illusion
 Depeche Mode – Enjoy The Silence

Studio covers
 London After Midnight – Sacrifice (Demo Home-studio)
 The Cult – Rain (Demo Rough Mix)
 Stage Dolls – Love Cries (Wings of Steel – a Norwegian Tribute to Stage Dolls)
 Rauli Badding Somerjoki – Tähdet Tähdet [Stars]

Chris Wicked's collaborations
 The Pleasures – Boy Next Door (Greatest Hits 2006) Backing Vocals
 Pyro All Stars – Talk Dirty to Me (Poison) (Live at Club Hulen, Bergen, 22/09/2006) [Radio Show Pyro (NRK P3)] Lead Singer
 Mama Trash All Stars Band – Lil' Devil (The Cult) (2012/Oct/06, Gloria, Helsinki, Trash Fest) Lead Singer & Tracy on lead guitars
 Faith Circus – Strutter (Kiss) (2012/Nov/10) Lead Vocals
 Mama Trash All Stars Band – Personal Jesus (Depeche Mode) (2013/Oct/05, Gloria, Helsinki, Trash Fest) Lead Singer
 Mama Trash All Stars Band – White Wedding (Billy Idol) (2013/Oct/05, Gloria, Helsinki, Trash Fest)
 Latexxx Teens – Warriors – (2013/Oct/05, Gloria, Helsinki, Trash Fest) Guest vocals feat. Chris Harms

Members

Current members

Former members

Session members

References

External links
 Official site
MALICE IN WONDERLAND at archaic-magazine.com

Glam rock groups
Norwegian musical groups